Aspitates aberrata is a moth of the family Geometridae first described by Henry Edwards in 1884. It is found in North America from northern Minnesota north and west across southern Manitoba to western Alberta and the Peace River area of British Columbia. The habitat consists of open aspen parklands and low elevation grasslands.

The wingspan is 27–36 mm. Adults are creamy white with a heavy dusting of brownish-grey scales, which is heavier on the forewings. There is a faint, thick straight grey line running across the outer third of the wing from the apex to lower margin. The hindwings are less heavily dusted and have a prominent grey discal spot.

There is one generation per year with adults on wing from mid-May to mid-July.

Subspecies
Aspitates aberrata aberrata (Alberta)
Aspitates aberrata assiniboiarus Munroe, 1963 (eastern Alberta, Saskatchewan, Manitoba)

References

Aspitatini
Moths of North America